Březno is a market town in Mladá Boleslav District in the Central Bohemian Region of the Czech Republic. It has about 1,100 inhabitants.

Administration
The village of Dolánky is an administrative part of Březno.

Etymology
The name Březno is derived from bříza (i.e. "birch"), meaning "birch forest".

Geography
It lies in the Jičín Uplands. The market town is situated on the left bank of the Klenice River. There are several ponds in the territory, the largest of them is Vražda.

History

The first written mention of Březno is from 1255. The village was owned by the Wartenberg family until the 15th century, then different noble families took turns in ownership. In 1561, during the rule of the Bubna of Litice family, Březno was promoted to a market town, but later it was degraded to a village. In 1727, it was again promoted to a market town by Emperor Charles VI.

Sights
The old dilapidated castle in Březno burned down in 1765 and a new, larger late Baroque castle was built in its place. The complex includes a castle, a historic carriage house and a large park. The castle is inaccessible to the public.

The Church of Saint Wenceslaus is a Baroque building from 1718, located next to the castle. A brick bell tower stands separately nearby. The bell tower was part of the old castle and dates from the early 16th century.

References

External links

Market towns in the Czech Republic
Populated places in Mladá Boleslav District